John Wildegryse was the member of Parliament for Coventry in 1472-75 and 1478. He was also mayor in 1460. He was a draper.

References 

Members of the Parliament of England for Coventry
English MPs 1472
Year of birth missing
Year of death missing
Mayors of Coventry
Drapers
English MPs 1478